MSDF may mean:
Japan Maritime Self-Defense Force, the Japanese Navy
 State Defense Forces:
Massachusetts State Defense Force
Missouri State Defense Force
Milwaukee Secure Detention Facility, a prison
Master of Science in Digital Forensics, an academic degree
Multi-channel signed distance field, a field created by a signed distance function